Beta patula is a species of wild beet in the family Amaranthaceae, native to Madeira. It is a close relative of Beta vulgaris. There are about 3000 individuals alive in the wild, distributed on two uninhabited islets; Ilhéu Chão, and Ilhéu da Cevada—also called dos Desembarcadouros—which is an extension of Ponta de São Lourenço and separated from it by only a few meters during high tide.

References

patula
Endemic flora of Madeira
Plants described in 1789